Convictolitavis (fl. mid-1st century BC) was a prominent member of the Celtic civitas of the Haedui during the Gallic Wars. He played a significant role in the pan-Gallic rebellion of 52 BC, as narrated by Julius Caesar in Book 7 of his Commentarii de Bello Gallico.

In the seventh year of the war, Caesar was surprised by the scope and strength of the resistance mounted by Vercingetorix, a leader of the neighboring Arverni, who was able to rally a number of Gallic civitates and tribes in a united effort to halt the Roman conquest of Gaul. Haeduan loyalties during this time appear to have been divided; the Aedui had been allies of Rome and enemies of the Arverni at least since the 120s BC, but Caesar was aware of opposing pro- and anti-Roman factions within the civitas from the beginning of the war.

This division recurs in the disputed Haeduan election for the annual office of vergobret, which Caesar describes as the chief magistracy of the civitas. Two men claimed victory: Convictolitavis and Cotus, whose brother had held the office the previous year. Aeduan law sought to limit the dynastic accumulation of power within a family by prohibiting a man from holding the vergobrecy if a close relative had within a specified period of time. Cotus, whatever the outcome of the vote, should have been ineligible.

A Haeduan delegation called in the Roman proconsul to mediate. Caesar claims that he did not want to involve himself with an internal political matter, and he could ill afford to turn his attention from Vercingetorix, but the instability of the Haedui and an impending civil war among what had long been Rome's staunchest ally in central Gaul warranted his presence. After reviewing the case and learning that the priests had already ratified the election of Convictolitavis, Caesar rejected the claim of Cotus and hastened back to his army.

Having obtained the desired office and Caesar's good graces, Convictolitavis no longer pretended to resist the rebellion. The Aeduan army, led by Litaviccus, was supposed to aid the Roman army at the siege of Gergovia, but  instead turned against Caesar. Forced to split up his army in order to deal with the approaching Haedui, Caesar lost the siege. Gergovia is noted as one of the few occasions in Gaul when Caesar was unquestionably out-generaled.

References

Celtic warriors
Celts
Gaulish rulers
Barbarian people of the Gallic Wars